Troppo Architects is an Australian architectural practice with the aim of promoting good tropical architecture in Australia's Top End. The practice was founded in 1980 in Darwin with the aid  of a Northern Territory grant to examine the history of the region's architecture.

The practice has established offices in six Australian locations, (Darwin, Adelaide, Fremantle, Launceston, Sydney and Byron Bay), and has completed projects in Africa, Asia and the Pacific. "It has a reputation for spare intelligent architecture that has evolved out of the architects' feeling for tradition and landscape. Not least, their buildings are designed for the climate."

History 
In the late 1970s, Phil Harris and Adrian Welke were two young Adelaide-raised Bachelor of Architecture students. In 1978, their final year of undergraduate study, they collaborated on the publication of "Influences in Regional Architecture",  Australia's first history of architecture outside the urban arena.

Troppo Architects was founded in 1980 by Harris and Welke, whose early careers had taken them to Darwin. The practice commenced with the aid of an NT Government history grant to research (and eventually define and publicise) the History of Tropical Housing in Australia's Top End. The practice had a slow start, but gained momentum when they were successful in a Low Cost House Competition organised by the City of Darwin, and they were engaged to build a prototype of their design. The prototype was economical to build, climatically comfortable to live in, easy to extend, and also uses little energy.  In its first decade, the practice refined and extended its skill in addressing the architectural requirements of the "Top End", gaining a wide range of work, including with remote aboriginal communities. Their approach has been applied to projects in: the Kimberley, Perth, Esperance, and inland WA; Adelaide, coastal, rural and far-northern SA; Melbourne and Victoria; Alice Springs and the Centre; Townsville, and north and far north Queensland; and most recently, inland and north-coast NSW.

In 1987, the practice was selected by the Gagudju Community, administrators of the Kakadu National Park, to design some park facilities.  Joining together with Glenn Murcutt, the collaboration was (to quote Murcutt) "highly productive". The work lead to international critical acclaim, and a number of important commissions.  The practice spread out across Australia: Phil Harris opened an office in Adelaide in 1999, and Adrian Welke opened an office Perth, leaving the original office in the hands of Dan Connolly.

Since 2010, Troppo has been run by five partners spread out across Australia: Greg MacNamara (Darwin), Geoff Clark (Launceston), Terry O'toole (Queensland: Brisbane & Townsville), Phil Harris (Adelaide), Adrian Welke (Perth) and Dan Connolly (Byron Bay). They work with a team of around twenty people and regularly collaborate with well-known architects such as Danny Wong, Glenn Murcutt, Phil Tait & Shane Thompson.

Directors
Troppo's founding directors are Phil Harris (Adelaide) and Adrian Welke (Perth). Other directors are : Jo Best (Darwin); Cary Duffield (Adelaide); Greg Norman (Sydney); Geoff Clark (Launceston): Sue Harper (Byron Bay).

Former directors are Greg McNamara, Lena Yali, Richard Layton, Fiona Hogg and Terry O'toole

Selected projects

Awards
Troppo is nationally and internationally recognised, and is Australia's 3rd most awarded practice. A full list of the details of awards can be found on the practice's website.

In addition to those mentioned above, they include:
 1992 Royal Australian Institute of Architects (RAIA) (NT) Tracy Memorial Award, - for Works in Kakadu for ANPWS
 1992 RAIA Special Jury Award - for architecture in Northern Australia
 1993 RAIA Robin Boyd Award - for Medium Density Precinct 2, Larrakeyah, for Defence Housing Australia (DHA)
 2010 Global Award for Sustainable Architecture, Paris
 2014 Australian Institute of Architects Gold Medal - awarded to Adrian Welke and Phil Harris

Summary of AIA/RAIA awards

Summary of non-AIA/RAIA awards
Adelaide Affordable Ecohousing Competition, winner, 2004
Arafura Medium Density Residential Design Competition, winner, 2006
Global Award for Sustainable Architecture, Paris, 2010
HIA (SA) Custom Built Homes Award, 2003 
MBA Building Excellence Award, 2003 
MBA National Environment and Energy Award, 2003 
Metal Building Award, 1994-5 (National Award by BHP / Metal Building Products Manuf. Assoc. for Bowali Visitor Centre, Kakadu National Park)
Northern Rivers Urban Design Awards, Award for Excellence, 2008 
Northern Rivers Urban Design Awards, Grand Winner, 2008 
Tel Aviv University Visitor Centre & School of Environmental Studies, International competition winner, 2002
Thuringowa City Council's Climate Responsive Design Competition, winner, 2003
Timber Design Awards, SA, 2010 
Tropical House Design Comp, Winner, Darwin, June 1990

References

Sources
Goad, Philip (1999/2005) Troppo Architects, Pesaro Publishing.

External links
Troppo Architects

Troppo
Companies based in Adelaide